The Capital District Conference was an IHSAA-sanctioned conference from 1945 to 1971. Made up of Indianapolis area schools, it included smaller suburban schools and private schools until the growth of the suburban Indianapolis area had caused the public schools to grow larger. These schools eventually sought out similar-sized schools to compete with, and by 1971, these schools became the nucleus of the Central Suburban Conference, as more suburban public schools joined, with the smaller private schools dropping out to become independent.

Schools

 Franklin Central was known as Franklin Township until 1960.
 Carmel played concurrently in the CDC and HCC 1952–58.
 Jackson Central played concurrently in the CDC and HCC 1961–65.

Resources 
 Almanac Sports- Capital District Conference

Indiana high school athletic conferences
High school sports conferences and leagues in the United States
Sports competitions in Indianapolis
Indiana High School Athletic Association disestablished conferences